Nam Gyu-ri (born April 26, 1985) is a South Korean singer and actress. She was the leader of the Korean female trio SeeYa. In 2009, Nam Gyu-ri had a contract dispute with the group's management company and left the group. Nam has also acted, most notably in the film Death Bell and the drama 49 Days.

Career 
Nam was born in Seoul, South Korea. She graduated from Kyunghee University specializing in Theater and Film (Department of Theater and Film). 

In April 2009, Core Contents Media, SeeYa's management company, announced that Nam Gyu-ri had violated the terms of her contract by refusing to perform her engagements as a member of SeeYa; the company also stated that it would potentially take legal action against Nam. Although the company later announced that she would return, it was eventually revealed that the issues could not be fully resolved, and Nam left again. In leaving the group permanently, Nam released a statement through her lawyers in which she said that she "could not possibly" return to SeeYa. In the statement, Nam announced that the reason for her departure was that she was more interested in pursuing an acting career than singing. Because it was impossible to pursue both paths, she had decided that she needed to give up working with the group.
For this reason, she declined offers from all record companies that were interested in recruiting SeeYa, and would henceforth make a new beginning as an actor and not a singer.

Shortly after finding new management, however, Nam resumed her singing career as a solo artist. Her new management company, Eyagi Entertainment, has confirmed that Nam would pursue a solo career in both acting and singing. Despite the fact that Nam stated she would not pursue her singing career as a solo singer, she managed to contribute in Ivy's comeback album "I Be.." in 2009.

In 2011, Nam returned to SeeYa temporarily during the group's promotion of its final album. SeeYa officially disbanded on January 30, 2011.

In 2014, Nam signed with SidusHQ, one of South Korea's most famous talent agencies.

In November 2018, Nam signed with new agency KORTOP Media, founded by veteran drama producer Go Dae-hwa.

In 2020, Nam acted as the second lead in Kairos, acting as a violinist and a sociopath who was secretly having an affair behind her husband's back while acting as a good wife and mother. She received favourable reviews for her acting of the villain in the drama.

In May 2022, Nam signed with My Company after her contract with her former agency expired.

Discography

Singles

Soundtrack appearances

Collaborations

Filmography

Film

Television series

Web series

Television shows

Music video

Awards and nominations

References

External links

 Nam Gyu-Ri's short biography on Naver

1985 births
IHQ (company) artists
Living people
MBK Entertainment artists
People from Seoul
South Korean female idols
South Korean film actresses
South Korean television actresses
South Korean women pop singers
21st-century South Korean actresses
21st-century South Korean singers
21st-century South Korean women singers